Youth homelessness is the problem of homelessness of young people around the globe.

Overview
Youth homelessness is a significant social issue globally, both in developing countries and many developed countries. In developing countries, research and prevention has mostly focused on "street children", while in developed countries, central concerns in the research and prevention of youth homelessness include breakdown in family relationships and other causes that lead to young people leaving home. The term "street children" also includes street workers who are not actually homeless.

The exact definition of youth homelessness varies by region. In the United States, a homeless youth is someone who is under the age of 21 and is unable to safely live with a relative, and has no other safe alternative living arrangement. In Australia, there are three categories of homelessness which include those who live from one emergency shelter to another (in homeless shelters or 'couch surfing' at friends' homes) as well as those living in accommodation that falls below minimum community standards (boarding houses and caravan parks).

Homeless people, and homeless organizations, are sometimes accused or convicted of fraudulent behaviour. Criminals are also known to exploit homeless people, ranging from identity theft to tax and welfare scams. These incidents often lead to negative connotations about homeless youth.

Australia
Youth homelessness in Australia is a significant social issue, affecting tens of thousands of young people. In 2006, the Australian government estimate, focusing on homeless school children, found some 20,000 homeless youth between the ages of 12 and 18. Another estimate found approximately 44,000 homeless Australians under the age of 25.

Activists maintain that the majority of young people leave home because of family breakdown, often caused by domestic violence and abuse.  Swinburne University researchers found that over $600 million is spent each year on health and justice services for homeless youth.

Researchers have studied the prevalence of psychological distress and mental illness among homeless youth in Australia.

Some experts argue that early intervention services are an effective way to curb youth homelessness. Other researchers have examined the potential solution of youth foyers.

Canada
In Canada, youth homelessness is recognized as a significant social issue, however, no nationwide strategy or study has been conducted.

Some researchers focus on the effects of homelessness on young LGBT Canadians. Others focus on various factors of physical and mental health among Canada's homeless youth.

United States

In the United States, homeless youth are a varied group. Some researchers maintain that around two million young people in America are homeless.
According to the National Conference of State Legislature, roughly 41,000 kids and young adults within the ages of 13-25 experience homelessness every night. Almost all of which have reported suffering from at least one of the following; substance misuse problems, mental health problems, foster care, juvenile jail or detention, and physical harm. Many of these individuals have experienced extreme trauma and despair either before or after becoming homeless. 

Looking through a demographic lens, lesbian, gay, bisexual and transgender youth have more than two times the risk of being homeless than a heterosexual. This can be a result from family problems along with not receiving acceptance by surrounding influences. Females in particular are more likely to “run away” from home resulting in no shelter.  

Many actions can be taken to help solve these homeless individuals in the United States. One factor that could make a positive change is reestablishing family relationships. This being the main starting point for homelessness, emphasizing the importance of loved ones can make all the difference. Another more direct action is improving the crisis response regarding these youth and young adults. Whether it’s state related, or even larger organizations, more plans and evaluations need to be made.

Health risks 
Youth homelessness is often accompanied by high risk behaviors like sex without a condom and drug use. This happens at a much higher rate than young people who have a stable living situation. Even though the risk of infection is much higher for homeless young people, studies have found that only 46% had been tested recently, suggesting that homeless youth are not any more likely to get tested for sexually transmitted infections (STI) than their peers. A history of neglect and abuse is common for youth who become homeless, so they often have a deep distrust of adults and other authority figures. Adults wanting to help these vulnerable young people will need to prove themselves to be trustworthy if they want to maintain any sort of lasting connection with them. Effective connections have been formed through offering free STI testing. While outreach for interviews saw a retention rate of less than 40%, similar studies offering free STI testing saw return visits as high as 98%. Readily available comprehensive healthcare will help address STI infection rates, and problems of social isolation for this population.

References

See also
Youth Homelessness Matters Day

Youth homelessness

Alder, C., 1991. Victims of violence: The case of homeless youth. Australian & New Zealand Journal of Criminology, 24(1), pp. 1–14. 
White, R., 1993. Youth and the conflict over urban space. Children's Environments, pp. 85–93.
Youth Homelessness in Australia, Youth Homelessness in Australia | Department of Social Services, Australian Government

Homelessness
Homelessness